Casa del Nino Jesus de Pagbilao (abbreviation: CNJP; local name: Casa) (Tagalog: Tahanan ng Batang Hesus sa Pagbilao) is a Filipino, private-Catholic education institution that offers complete basic education courses under the K-12 Basic Education Program of the Department of Education (Philippines). The institution offers pre-elementary, elementary and high school levels located in the municipality of Pagbilao in Quezon Province, Philippines. The main campus is at the heart of the town facing the Pagbilao municipal hall and the Pagbilao public park.

It was established under the direction of the Bishop of the Roman Catholic Diocese of Lucena, Most Rev. Ruben T. Profugo. It is a non-stock, non-profit educational institution formerly housed in the rectory of St. Catherine of Alexandria Parish in Pagbilao. The school is a member of Lucena Diocesan Catholic Schools Association  (LUDICSA)  and the Catholic Educational Association of the Philippines (CEAP).

History
In June 1984, CNJP formally opened its doors to 18 pre-elementary boys and girls. In January 1990, CNJP was conferred the Certificate of Recognition by the Roman Catholic Diocese of Lucena. On July 17 of the same year with Dr. Rosalie Batocabe as educational consultant, the school received its Government Recognition No. K-025 for its nursery, kindergarten and preparatory courses to grade one. Every year, a new curriculum level has been added until the first batch of elementary students graduated in 1999.

CNJP is managed by the Parish priest of St. Catherine of Alexandria and supported lay individuals. Its first incorporators were Most Rev. Ruben T. Profugo, Msgr. Conrado L. Reynoso, Msgr. Justino Manaog-Gabriel, Mr. Crispulo M. Pionilla, Mr. Domingo P. Luce, Mrs. Enrica L. Pandy and Atty. Indalecio Pandy. The parish priests who served as Director of the School were: Msgr. Sergio L. Cuvin from 1989 to 1996; Msgr. Antonio L. Obeña, 1996–2003 and succeeded by Msgr. Dennis M. Imperial.

In 1991, when Mr. Crispulo M. Pionilla invited Mrs. Rosalie Batocabe to work at CNJP as Management Consultant of the school. Mrs. Batocabe was then the high school principal of Maryhill Academy on sabbatical for her doctoral studies at De La Salle University, Manila. She accepted the invitation and the following year began work at the school.

The Parents’ Coordinating Council was organized with Mrs. Teresita R. Glorioso as president. Its fund raising project, the Search for Munting Mutya at Lakan ng Casa was launched. It became a yearly event aimed at raising more funds for the construction of the envisioned school building on the vacant lot within the churchyard.

June 1994 saw the rise of the first concrete building which housed a classroom, a comfort room, a clinic and an office. Financial support for the construction were sourced form the two year fund-raising programs of the Parents’ Coordinating Council and from donations of parishioners. The Daughters of Mary of the Immaculate Conception and the Knights of Columbus made possible the building of a stage at the churchyard.

During SY 1997-98 under the leadership of Msgr. Antonio L. Obeña, the six standard-sized classrooms were added to the school building. The construction was under the management and supervision of Mr. Bonifacio Orgas II, chairman of infrastructure, Mr. Domingo Luce, financial officer and the members of the board of trustees. Computer education was included in the grade school curriculum in 1995. In 1998, CNJP offered the first curriculum year for the secondary course under the kind assistance and effort of Mrs. Liberacion G. Alabastro, who conducted enrollment campaign to open the first year secondary level. She was appointed Principal for the first four years of the Secondary Department from 1998 to 2002; and had the first batch of graduates in March, 2002.

In May 2003, Msgr. Dennis M. Imperial, P.C. the newly assigned parish priest of the St. Catherine of Alexandria became the new director of CNJP with Mrs. Marcelita M. Martinez, as school principal. Assisting her is Mr. Apolinario Pollo, also the school's guidance counselor.

In 2009, the school placed top 15 among 600 private schools in Region IV-A in the National Career Achievement Examination (NCAE) for 4th year high school students by the Department of Education (Philippines).

In 2010, CNJP is managed and supervised by the Lucena Diocesan Catholic Schools Association (LUDICSA) with the headquarters in Brgy. Isabang, Lucena City and a congregation of nuns from the Daughters of St. Therese based in Cebu. The new principal starting school year 2010-2011 is Sr. Ernanita P. Mindajao, DST. The school director is Rev. Fr. Librado M. Burgos with the school chaplain, Fr. Jose Ilagan Cantos II.

Last January 2013, Casa del Niño Jesus de Pagbilao celebrated their 30th Foundation Anniversary.

Today, CNJP welcomed its new school director, Rev. Fr. Ferdinand Maano and school chaplain, Fr. Archie.

Now and then Casa del Niño Jesus De Pagbilao will be Good and respect to God Always.

References

Schools in Quezon
Catholic elementary schools in the Philippines
Catholic secondary schools in the Philippines